The 1927 Spring Hill Badgers football team was an American football team that represented Spring Hill College, a Jesuit college in Mobile, Alabama, during the 1927 college football season. In its third season under head coach William T. Daly, the team compiled a 6–1 record.

Schedule

References

Spring Hill
Spring Hill Badgers football seasons
Spring Hill Badgers football